Ryan F. Craig (born January 6, 1982) is a Canadian former professional ice hockey centre and current assistant coach with the Vegas Golden Knights of the National Hockey League. Prior to retirement, he was the captain of the Cleveland Monsters in the American Hockey League (AHL). Craig was drafted 255th overall in the 2002 NHL Entry Draft by the Tampa Bay Lightning.

Playing career

As a youth, Craig played in the 1996 Quebec International Pee-Wee Hockey Tournament with a minor ice hockey team from Abbotsford, British Columbia.

Craig started his junior ice hockey career with the Brandon Wheat Kings of the Western Hockey League and made his debut by appearing in one game in the 1997–98 season as a 16-year-old. In the 2000–01 season, Craig led Brandon in scoring and was named the team MVP the following year. Serving as a captain in his final two seasons in the WHL, Craig tied for the lead in scoring in the 2002–03 season, and ranked sixth in the WHL in goals, first in game-winning goals (11) and tied for eighth in power play goals.

After spending his first seven professional seasons within the Lightning organization, on July 3, 2010, Craig signed as a free agent to a two-way, 1-year $500,000 contract with the Pittsburgh Penguins. On June 13, 2011, Craig re-signed with the Penguins for one year.

After captaining the Penguins' AHL affiliate, the Wilkes Barre Scranton Penguins, for two seasons, Craig left the Penguins' organization. Unable to earn an NHL deal, he signed a one-year AHL contract with the Springfield Falcons on July 19, 2012.

Craig was selected as the Falcons' captain in his first season with the club, in 2012–13. He scored 20 goals and 47 points in 75 games to help Springfield reach the second round of the post-season. On July 5, 2013, Craig was signed to a two-year, two-way contract with the Falcons' NHL affiliate, the Columbus Blue Jackets.

On June 29, 2015, Craig continued his affiliation with the Blue Jackets, by signing a two-year contract with their new AHL affiliate, the Lake Erie Monsters. In his first season with the Monsters in 2015–16, Craig led the team as Captain in capturing their first Calder Cup championship.

He was announced as an assistant coach with the Vegas Golden Knights expansion team on June 9, 2017 and simultaneously retired from his playing career.

Personal life
Craig is married to Jaydee, who grew up in Souris, Manitoba. They have a son named Carson and two daughters.

Career statistics

Awards and honours

References

External links

1982 births
Living people
Brandon Wheat Kings players
Canadian ice hockey centres
Cleveland Monsters players
Columbus Blue Jackets players
Hershey Bears players
Ice hockey people from British Columbia
Lake Erie Monsters players
Norfolk Admirals players
Sportspeople from Abbotsford, British Columbia
Pittsburgh Penguins players
Springfield Falcons players
Tampa Bay Lightning draft picks
Tampa Bay Lightning players
Vegas Golden Knights coaches
Wilkes-Barre/Scranton Penguins players
Canadian ice hockey coaches